The Faroe Islands competed at the inaugural 7 sports 2018 European Championships from 2 to 12 August 2018.

Competitors

Two competitors, Alvi Hjelm and Signhild Joensen, competed in aquatics.

Aquatics

References

External links
 European Championshipsofficial site 

Nations at the 2018 European Championships
2018 in Faroese sport